Hunteria ghanensis is a species of small to medium tree of the family Apocynaceae. It is native to Ghana and Ivory Coast. It grows inland in the dry forests of the Guinean forest-savanna mosaic. It is threatened by habitat loss.

References

ghanensis
Flora of Ghana
Trees of Africa
Endangered plants
Flora of Ivory Coast
Plants described in 1979
Taxonomy articles created by Polbot